The Vatican Cricket Team is an amateur cricket team established by the Vatican to help establish ties between the Catholic Church and countries and regions where the sport is popular including India and the Caribbean and to encourage inter-faith dialogue.

History

Prior to the official establishment of the Vatican Cricket Team, an ad hoc Vatican team played its first (international) match against the Dutch Fellowing Of Oddly Odd Countries Cricket Club. The match-date was 13 September 2008 and the venue being the Stadio dei Marmi. Using an impromptu pitch the Vatican team scored 107 runs for just one wicket. FFOP C.C. was all out for 58, in a 35 over match. 
The first cricket match played by the Vatican Cricket Team was in May 2008, a friendly match against Roma Capannelle Cricket Club, with the Serie A club winning the match.

In 2013, the "St Peter's Cricket Club", initially the idea of Australia's ambassador to the Holy See, John McCarthy, announced its formation. The club was tasked with recruiting players from among the "300 seminarians and priests housed at Catholic colleges and seminaries around Rome", not therefore citizens of Vatican City. The most talented players were to be invited to join the Vatican Cricket Team, or "the Vatican XI". The Club plays its home matches at the Roma Capannelle Cricket Ground, home of Roma Capannelle CC, the only international cricket ground in Rome.

The team itself was established in June 2014, with the initial player list consisting of "priests, deacons and seminarians", primarily recruited from India. A small number of players from  England, Sri Lanka and Pakistan were also included. The team is sponsored by the Pontifical Council for Culture.

Tour of England

The Vatican Cricket Team will undertake their Fourth "Light of Faith Tour" in England over the summer of 2018. The team will play the first fixture of the tour against a specially-formed Stonyhurst College Gentlemen's XI from the famous Roman Catholic independent school. Founded in 1593, Stonyhurst College is an independent co-educational Catholic boarding and day school, occupying a magnificent Grade I listed building in Lancashire. Founded in 1593, it is the oldest Jesuit School in the world.  The tour commencement at Stonyhurst acknowledges the school's long history of combining faith, academics and sporting excellence.

The team, made up of priests, deacons and seminarians studying and working in Rome and at the Vatican, will also play their first match at Lord's. Its opponents at Lord's will be an interfaith team, while other matches will include one against a Commonwealth of Nations XI, and against the British Royal Household Cricket Club at Windsor. The tour begins at Stonyhurst on 4 July 2018.

The team last toured England in September 2014, playing a team representing the Church of England and another representing the household of the British Royal Family. During a visit to Pakistan, representatives of the team met with Ishrat-ul-Ibad Khan who proposed a series of matches against his own "Governor of Sindh's XI" consisting of Islamic theology students.

Tour of Portugal

In 2017, the team visited a cricket stadium in Miranda do Corvo for the 3rd official 'Light of Faith Tour', where the team was greeted at the stadium gates with a Fire Brigade Salute.

See also
Sport in Vatican City
Vatican City national football team
Index of Vatican City-related articles

References

Sport in Vatican City
National cricket teams
Cricket clubs established in 2008